Naphthalenetetracarboxylic diimide (NTCDI) is a solid organic compound and one of the simplest naphthalenediimides (NDIs). NTCDI is produced from the parent naphthalene via an intermediate compound naphthalenetetracarboxylic dianhydride.

Properties

NTCDI is redox-active, forming stable radical anions near -1.10 V vs. Fc/Fc+. Its ability to accept electrons reflects the presence of an extended conjugated ring system and the  electron withdrawing groups (carbonyl centers). NDI is used in supramolecular chemistry owing to its tendency to form charge-transfer complexes with crown ethers, e.g., to give rotaxanes and catenanes. As another consequence of their planar structure and electron-acceptor properties, NDIs intercalate into DNA. It is also suitable for fabrication of soft electronic devices.

References

Naphthalenes